739 Mandeville is a minor planet located in the asteroid belt. Its absolute magnitude is 8.50. It was discovered on 7 February 1913 by Joel Hastings Metcalf in Winchester, Massachusetts, and assigned the provisional code 1913 QR. A later, duplicate discovery was assigned the code 1963 HE.

The orbital characteristics are calculated from the epoch of 4 January 2010, at which time 739 Mandeville had an orbital period of 1656 days and an orbital axis of 2.74 AU with eccentricity 0.14. Thus, its minimum distance from the sun was 2.35 and its maximum was 3.13. Its orbital inclination was found to be 20.71°, and its mean anomaly 116.58°.

See also
 List of minor planets/701–800
 Meanings of minor planet names: 501–1000

References

External links
 
 

Background asteroids
Mandeville
Mandeville
X-type asteroids (Tholen)
X-type asteroids (SMASS)
19130207